The Trio No. 1 in B-flat major for piano, violin, and cello, D. 898, was written by Franz Schubert in 1827. The composer finished the work in 1828, in the last year of his life. It was published in 1836 as Opus 99, eight years after the composer's death. Like the E-flat major trio, it is an unusually large scale work for piano trio, taking around 40 minutes in total to perform.

Structure

The piano trio contains four movements:

Discography 
 Alfred Cortot, piano; Jacques Thibaud, violin; Pablo Casals, 'cello (Kingsway Hall, London, July 5 and 6, 1926; originally released in October 1926 as HMV DB947/50, with US issue as Victor set M 11)
 New York Trio (Clarence Adler, piano; Louis Edlin, violin; Cornelius van Vliet, 'cello) (May 24, 1928; released late 1928 as Edison Diamond Discs 80898/901; deleted December 31, 1929)
 Eugene Istomin, piano; Isaac Stern, violin; Leonard Rose, 'cello (1964).
 Trio Dali (Amandine Savary, piano; Jack Liebeck, violin; Christian-Pierre La Marca, 'cello) (2011).

Notes

References
 
 
 Gramophone Magazine, "Classics reconsidered: Schubert’s B flat Trio from Thibaud, Casals and Cortot," https://www.gramophone.co.uk/features/article/classics-reconsidered-schubert-s-b-flat-trio-from-thibaud-casals-and-cortot
 Fluff on the Needle, "Losing the Plot," June 16, 2012, https://fluffontheneedle.blogspot.com/2012/06/loosing-plot.html

External links
 
 Performance of Piano Trio No. 1 by the Eroica Trio from the Isabella Stewart Gardner Museum in MP3 format

Chamber music by Franz Schubert
Schubert 01
1827 compositions
Compositions by Franz Schubert published posthumously
Compositions in B-flat major